Steuerwald is a German toponymic surname for a person from Hanover. Notable people with the surname include:

Greg Steuerwald (born 1952), American politician
Markus Steuerwald (born 1989), German volleyball player

References

German-language surnames
Toponymic surnames